José Cardoso Urbano (born March 1, 1966 in Guarda, Beira Interior Norte) is a retired male race walker from Portugal. He is a three-time Olympian.

Achievements

References

1966 births
Living people
People from Guarda, Portugal
Portuguese male racewalkers
Athletes (track and field) at the 1988 Summer Olympics
Athletes (track and field) at the 1992 Summer Olympics
Athletes (track and field) at the 1996 Summer Olympics
Olympic athletes of Portugal
Sportspeople from Guarda District